Jack Alvin "Alvy" Moore (December 5, 1921 – May 4, 1997) was an American actor best known for his role as scatterbrained county agricultural agent Hank Kimball on the CBS television series Green Acres. His character would often make a statement, only to immediately negate the statement himself and then negate the corrected statement until his stream of statements was interrupted by a frustrated Oliver Wendell Douglas portrayed by Eddie Albert. One such statement was, "Good morning, Mr. Douglas! Well, it's not a good morning ... but it's not a bad morning either!" Moore appeared in 142 of the 170 total Green Acres episodes.

Early life
Alvy Moore was born in Vincennes, Indiana, the son of Indiana natives Roy and Elice Moore. When Alvy was young the family moved to Terre Haute, where Roy was a grocery store manager.   Alvy was president of the senior class at Wiley High School in 1940–41. He then attended Indiana State Teachers College—now Indiana State University—both before and after service with the United States Marine Corps during World War II, in which he saw combat in the Battle of Iwo Jima.

Acting career
He became an actor and furthered his training at the Pasadena Playhouse, succeeding David Wayne in the role of Ensign Pulver opposite Henry Fonda's Mister Roberts on Broadway, and later toured with the play for 14 months. He made his screen debut playing the quartermaster in Okinawa (1952).

Moore appeared in guest and supporting roles in a number of movies and television shows, including My Little Margie in 1952, as Dillard Crumbly, an efficiency expert fresh out of Efficiency College, and The Mickey Mouse Club, where he hosted "What I Want to Be" segments as the Roving Reporter. He had a small role as a member of Marlon Brando's motorcycle gang in the 1953 film The Wild One, and a similar bit part the same year as one of the Linda Rosa townspeople in The War of the Worlds. Moore co-starred with Dick Powell and Debbie Reynolds in the 1954 film Susan Slept Here, in which he displayed his natural gift for physical comedy. In 1955, he co-starred with Brian Keith and Kim Novak in   5 Against the House. In the early 1960s he was cast in the recurring role of Howie in 11 episodes of the CBS sitcom Pete and Gladys, with Harry Morgan and Cara Williams.

Moore made a brief appearance as a cab driver in the 1964 Perry Mason episode "The Case of the Wednesday Woman." He also appeared in two episodes of another CBS sitcom, The Dick Van Dyke Show, "The Impractical Joke" as an IRS agent named William Handlebuck and "The Case Of The Pillow" as a shifty home goods salesman named Mr. Wiley. In 1965 he appeared in an episode of Gomer Pyle, U.S.M.C. ("Old Man Carter"). He found his niche in television, starring as the incompetent county agent Hank Kimball in GREEN ACRES from 1965 to 1971.  He was also a guest star on The Andy Griffith Show and later on Little House on the Prairie. He was an actor, producer, and uncredited scriptwriter for A Boy and His Dog. He attended DisCon II, the 1974 World Science Fiction Convention, to help promote the film.  In 1978, Moore appeared as stage coach station master Swenson in three episodes of How the West Was Won (S2 E6 "Cattle Drive," S2 E7 "Robbers Roost," and S2 E10 "Gold").  One of Moore's last television appearances was a brief guest shot on the sitcom Frasier.

In the 1980s Moore appeared in many cult horror films, including Scream (1981), Mortuary (1983), They're Playing With Fire (1984), Intruder (1989), and The Horror Show (1989).

Personal life
Moore met his wife Carolyn in 1947 while both were actors with the Pasadena Playhouse. They married in 1950 and traveled with the national touring company of Mister Roberts before settling in Los Angeles to start their family. Alvy and Carolyn had three children:  Janet, Alyson, and Barry. Carolyn continued to be involved in acting, doing dinner theater and various church productions.

In his spare time during the 1960s, he umpired Little League baseball in Lake View Terrace and Toluca Lake, California, and played in charity golf tournaments across the country.  He was proud of his role of Hank Kimball in Green Acres, and until his death he drove a white Chrysler with the license plate "GRNACRS."

Alvy and Carolyn Moore were married 47 years. Alvy died of heart failure on May 4, 1997, at their home in Palm Desert, California. Former Green Acres actor Tom Lester was with him when he died. For over 50 years Carolyn was a member of Beta Sigma Phi, a women's sorority group that raises money for charity. In 2008 she received the "International Award of Distinction," the highest honor the organization bestows on active members. She also was a member and treasurer of the "Motion Picture Mothers" for over 30 years. Carolyn Moore died at age 79 in 2009.

Filmography

See also 

Alvy Moore also had an appearance as Dr Grant on The Munsters TV series 1965 episode "Bats Of A Feather."

References

External links
 
 
 Interview
 The Roving Mooseketeer
 "Mr. Kimball" Tops List of TV Greats in Secondary Role

1921 births
1997 deaths
American male film actors
United States Marine Corps personnel of World War II
American male television actors
Male actors from Indiana
Indiana State University alumni
People from Palm Desert, California
Actors from Terre Haute, Indiana
People from Vincennes, Indiana
United States Marines
Burials at Forest Lawn Memorial Park (Hollywood Hills)
20th-century American male actors